The table below lists the decisions (known as reasons) delivered from the bench by the Supreme Court of Canada during 2014. The table illustrates what reasons were filed by each justice in each case, and which justices joined each reason. This list, however, does not include reasons on motions.

Reasons

2014 statistics

References

External links
 2014 decisions: CanLII, LexUM

Supreme Court of Canada reasons by year